Union Township is one of fourteen townships in Clinton County, Indiana, United States. As of the 2010 census, its population was 973 and it contained 395 housing units.  The township's name refers to its creation from the northern part of Center Township and the southern part of Owen.

Elected Officials
 Trustee Kevin Evans, Elected January 1, 2023
Current Address of Union Township: 1750 E Garnett Dr. Frankfort, IN 46041

Current Phone Number of Union Township: 765-357-0390

 Board Chairman: Paul Dorsey
 Board Member: David Little
 Board Member: Joe Carter

History
Organized in 1889, Union was the last of Clinton County's townships to be created.  It was formed as the result of dissatisfaction among the residents of northern Center Township with "a tax donation made to secure the Clover Leaf shops at Frankfort."

Geography

Unincorporated towns
 Kilmore

Adjacent townships
 Owen Township (north)
 Michigan Township (east)
 Center Township (south)
 Washington Township (west)
 Ross Township (northwest)

Major highways
  U.S. Route 421
  Indiana State Road 75

Cemeteries
Cemeteries:

 City Dump
 Kilmore
 St. Luke's
 ...and more

References
 United States Census Bureau cartographic boundary files
 U.S. Board on Geographic Names

Townships in Clinton County, Indiana
Townships in Indiana
1889 establishments in Indiana
Populated places established in 1889